Rita Ferrandino (born February 17, 1963) is an American businesswoman in the educational publishing industry.

Early life and education
Ferrandino was born to Italian immigrants in Reading, Pennsylvania. She is a graduate of Pennsylvania State University, where she earned a B.S. in business management in 1985 and an MBA in 1997.

Career
Ferrandino is the founding partner at Arc Capital Development, a global private equity and advisory firm. Arc invests in and operates companies in the K-20 education and special needs markets and has served over 80 clients in the United States, Canada, Mexico, Singapore, Hong Kong, China, Ireland, Turkey, Israel, and India. Her career includes selling more than $178 million of products to the higher education and K-12 markets, leading the acquisition effort for more than 50 STEM titles, and forming revenue-producing alliances with more than a dozen of the industry’s largest publishers and distributors. She has been responsible for double-digit sales growth for at least six years at two different major publishers.

She served as CEO of two Arc portfolio companies and has led company sales, acquisition, alliance, and marketing efforts for traditional print, technology, and online products for some of the industry’s largest publishers. She sits on the board of directors for Arc family company Quick Key Mobile.

In addition to her role as co-founder of Arc, she served on the board of directors and as CEO for Chicago Educational Publishing Company for 12 years, which published the Science Companion product line developed by the founders of Everyday Mathematics. She launched the company, delivered a new product version, and secured a multi-million dollar distribution agreement with Pearson Scott Foresman within 18 months. The company was recently acquired.

Her expertise is often tapped as panelist on Florida This Week, a PBS production where she received an Emmy award nominee in 2012. Tampa media named her one of “8 in 2008 to Watch” and in February 2009, she was honored as the cover story in West Coast Woman magazine.

Along with co-founder Kevin Custer, she is a guest lecturer at the Harvard Graduate School of Education’s Entrepreneurship in the Education Marketplace. She serves as a Business Mentor at Learn Launch, Boston’s Ed Tech Startup Accelerator.

As former executive director of the Elementary Science Coalition, Ferrandino built federal support for elementary science education.  In 2012, she was selected as a Presidential Elector for the State of Florida .

Community leadership activities includes service as president of Sarasota Scullers Youth Rowing Program, vice president of the Sarasota County Rowing Club, Sarasota County Rowing Association board of directors, and Sarasota YMCA's board of directors.

Political activities
Ferrandino moved to Sarasota, Florida in 2004 after living most of her career in the Northeast.  She was elected chair of the Sarasota County Democratic Party prior to the start of the hotly contested 2008 presidential election. In 2008 Ferrandino served as a delegate to the 2008 Democratic National Convention in Denver, where she appeared among the delegates interviewed for a New York Times video series.

Since 2011, she appeared as a guest on Florida This Week, a public affairs program airing on WEDU, the PBS affiliate in Tampa, Florida. In 2010, Ferrandino wrote a guest column in the Sarasota Herald-Tribune. She was cited in a Sarasota Herald-Tribune article, "Eight to Watch in 2008,"  an April 2009 SRQ Magazine cover story entitled “Fighting Nice,”  and a 2008 Sarasota Herald-Tribune story, "Leading A Party Toward Renewal". In 2012, she served as a delegate to the Democratic National Convention  and as one of Florida's 29 electors.

In December 2012, Ferrandino was reelected to a two-year term as the chair of the Democratic Party for the county. During her service to the Democratic Party in a swing county in a swing state, Ferrandino hosted Democratic officials and key influencers, including Bill Clinton, Barack Obama, Joe Biden, Steny Hoyer, Debbie Wasserman Schultz, Barney Frank, Julian Bond, and others.

References 

Living people
1963 births